Coleophora vestalella is a moth of the family Coleophoridae. It is found in France, Spain and Mallorca.

Full-grown larvae can be found from May to June.

References

vestalella
Moths of Europe
Moths described in 1859